Snap! (formerly Build Your Own Blocks) is a free, block-based educational graphical programming language and online community allowing students to explore, create, and remix interactive animations, games, stories, and more, while learning about mathematical and computational ideas. While inspired by Scratch, Snap! has many advanced features. The Snap! editor, and programs created in it, are web applications that run in the browser (like Scratch 3) without requiring installation.

User interface
[[File:Snap! Default interface.jpg|thumb|left|420px|Three resizable columns, containing five regions, in Snap!'''s IDE at startup]]
In Snap!, the screen is organized in three resizable columns containing five regions: the block group selector (top of left column), the blocks palette (left column), the main area (middle column), and the stage area (top of right column) with the sprite selector (also called the sprite corral) showing sprite thumbnails below it.

In the interactively resizable stage area are shown the graphical results of the scripts running in the script area and/or interactively double-clicked individual blocks in any palette. Individual blocks can be dragged from the palette onto the scripts area to be associated with the selected sprite.

Snap!'s blocks are divided into eight groups: Motion, Looks, Sound, Pen, Control, Sensing, Operators, and Variables. The layout of these groups in the block group selector is shown in the table below.

The central area can show scripts, costumes, or sounds associated with the selected sprite. What that area shows depends on the selected tab.

Features
The most important features that Snap! offers, but Scratch does not, include:
 expressions using anonymous functions, represented by a block inside a gray ring, having one or more empty slot(s)/argument(s) that are filled by a "higher order function" (the one that is calling the anonymous one). (Their computer-science theoretical basis is First class functions, which in turn have Lambda calculus as their even more abstract, mathematical, foundation),
 lists that are first class (including lists of lists/arrays), 
 First class sprites (in other words prototype-oriented instance-based classless object programming),
 "Hyperblocks": functions whose natural domain is scalars (text or numbers), extended to accept lists as inputs and apply the underlying function to the scalars in the list or a sublist,
 nestable sprites,
 codification of Snap! programs to text languages such as Python, JavaScript, C, etc.
 metaprogramming, reflection, and macros.

Mascot
Alonzo, the mascot of Snap!, bears the name of Alonzo Church, the inventor of a model of computation in which a universal function, represented by lambda, can create any function behavior by calling it on itself in various combinations. The mascot is a modified version of Gobo from Scratch. Because Alonzo Church's work is called  lambda calculus, the mascot's hair is shaped as the Greek letter lambda.

Special-purpose blocks (libraries)
Extended sets of blocks can be found in Snap! libraries, such as the 'streams' library that enables one to make the complete, infinite Fibonacci sequence, for example, using the special blocks ('stream', 'show stream', 'tail of stream', and 'map over stream' block) from the library.

Many other libraries are available, such as the 'list utilities' library, the 'words, sentences' library, the 'iterations' library, the 'animation' library, the 'frequency distribution' library, the 'audio computation' library, the 'bar charts' library, the 'world map' library, the 'colors and crayons' library,  the 'strings and multi-line input' library,  the 'parallelization' library, etc. for other special purposes.

History
The web-based Snap! and older desktop-based BYOB have been both developed by Jens Mönig for Windows, OS X and Linux with design ideas and documentation provided by Brian Harvey from University of California, Berkeley and have been used to teach "The Beauty and Joy of Computing" introductory course in computer science (CS) for non-CS-major students. Jens was a member of the Scratch Team before creating Snap!. BYOB is still available for downloading.

License
The source code of Snap! is Affero General Public License (AGPL) licensed and is hosted on GitHub. The earlier, desktop-based 3.x version's code is available under a license that allows modification for only non-commercial uses and can be downloaded from the UC Berkeley website or CNET's Download.com and TechTracker download page.CNET's Download.com and TechTracker BYOB for Mac download page

Platforms
Snap! is implemented in JavaScript using an HTML5 Canvas application programming interface (API), and because of that it runs on the major web-browsers on Windows, iOS, OS X and Linux devices.

Recognition
Snap! has been recognized by the Logo Foundation, and reviewed in an online magazine for programmers. As of December 2014, 100 New York City (NYC) high schools will introduce University of California, Berkeley's “Beauty and Joy of Computing” as a new AP Computer Science Principles course starting in 2015, using Snap!.  Jens and Brian received the National Technology Leadership Summit (NTLS) 2020 Educational Leadership Award for lifetime achievement based in part on Snap!''.

Notes

References

External links
 

American children's websites
Educational programming languages
Free educational software
Pedagogic integrated development environments
Smalltalk programming language family
Video game development software
Software developer communities
Visual programming languages